Events from the year 1841 in Denmark.

Incumbents
 Monarch – Christian VIII
 Prime minister – Otto Joachim

Events

Births
 13 June – Julius Villiam Gudmand-Høyer, author (died 1915)
 6 July – Christian Bayer, illustrator (died 1933)

Deaths
 30 April — Peter Andreas Heiberg, author (born 1758)
 19 June – Ludvig Mariboe, businessman, publisher and politician (born 1781)
 17 November – Cladius Detlev Fritzsch, flower painter (born 1765)
 21 November  Thomas Blom, master mason and architect (born 1888)

References

 
1840s in Denmark
Denmark
Years of the 19th century in Denmark